Becky Mill or Becky Merchant also previously known as Rebecca Merchant is a former Scottish female field hockey player who played for the Scotland women's national field hockey team. She represented Scotland for 12 years in a career spanning from 2007–2018. In January 2020, she announced her retirement from international arena.

Career 
She grew and raised up in Surrey and moved to Edinburgh to pursue her higher studies in university. She started playing the sport of field hockey from the age of 7. She is an alumna of Kingston Grammar School.

She made her international debut in 2007 against Ireland. She made her maiden Commonwealth Games appearance representing Scotland at the 2010 Commonwealth Games. Becky achieved 100 international caps during the 2015 Women's EuroHockey Nations Championship in a match against Italy. She also made her captaincy debut in 2016 against South Africa. She last represented the national team in a friendly game against Ireland in 2018 and announced her international retirement in 2020.

References 

Living people
Scottish female field hockey players
Field hockey players at the 2010 Commonwealth Games
Field hockey players at the 2014 Commonwealth Games
Commonwealth Games competitors for Scotland
Year of birth missing (living people)